"Wild Roses" is a song by Icelandic indie folk group Of Monsters and Men. It was released on 12 July 2019 by Republic Records as the second single for their third studio album Fever Dream (2019). Written by Nanna Bryndís Hilmarsdóttir and Ragnar Þórhallsson and produced by Of Monsters and Men and Rich Costey, it is a folk power ballad about recovering from pain that progressively builds into a huge-sounding outro. It was a top-20 hit in Iceland but performed far weaker in North America, only spending two weeks on the Billboard Hot Rock Songs chart and peaking at 38.

Composition 
On Fever Dream, Of Monsters and Men introduces a bunch of electronic and synthesizer textures to their sounds. "Wild Roses" is an example of this, mixing the pace of their folk work with the production of dance hall and new wave music. Influenced by dance music and Joseph Campbell's book The Power of Myth (1988), Hilmarsdóttir went for an melancholic "introverted side" with "Wild Roses". "Wild Roses" depicts Hilmarsdóttir nervously singing in a similar haunting manner to "I of the Storm" over calm piano and strings, heavy drums, and the occasional bits of synthesizers and auto-tuned voices. Also similar to the Beneath the Skin cut "Organs", it is a folk power ballad that builds in tension to a "big finish" with a brass section. Although "Wild Roses" is an upbeat track with a pop groove, the lyrics deal with the difficulty of recovering from pain and contain imagery of vines, flying moths, and "wild roses on a bed of leaves in the month of May".

Release 
"Wild Roses" was released on 12 July 2019 as the second single of Fever Dream. The music video was directed by Þóra Hilmars and released on 17 October 2019. It was filmed in a swimming pool in Hafnarfjörður in 12 hours, just before the group went on the Fever Dream tour. Influenced by Scandinavian horror, the video depicts Hilmarsdóttir performing a dance routine, choreographed by Stella Rosenkranzto, in a blood-filled pool.

Commercial performance 
In Of Monsters and Men's native country of Iceland, "Wild Roses" debuted at number 18 and reached number 12 in its seventh week on the chart. In terms of North American Billboard rock and alternative charts, the song was the weakest-performing Fever Dreams single. It debuted at 38 on the Hot Rock Songs and only re-entered at number 41 following the release of Fever Dream, lasting for only two weeks and, unlike "Alligator" and "Wars", failing to enter the Rock Airplay, Alternative Airplay, Adult Alternative Airplay, and Canada Rock charts.

Critical reception 
PopMatters journalist Jordan Blum enjoyed "Wild Roses" as "celebratory but frank, with a robust and danceable backing that's quite infectious". Sean Maunier, a writer for Metro Weekly, praised the vocalists for pushing their boundaries on Fever Dream, citing "Wild Roses" as an example of the presentation of Hilmarsdóttir's versatility. Graham Kervin of Slant Magazine, however, felt the dance percussion robbed the "airy quiet" of Hilmarsdóttir's performance.

Personnel 
Credits adapted from the liner notes of Fever Dream.

Of Monsters and Men
Nanna Bryndís Hilmarsdóttir – vocals, writing
Ragnar Þórhallsson – vocals, writing
Brynjar Leifsson – guitar, synthesizer 
Kristján Páll Kristjánsson – bass, synth bass
Arnar Rósenkranz Hilmarsson – drums, percussion
Steingrímur Karl Teague – piano

Other
Rich Costey – production, mixing
Martin Cooke – engineering
Joe LaPorta – mastering

Charts

Weekly charts

Year-end charts

References 

2010s ballads
2019 songs
2019 singles
Folk ballads
Of Monsters and Men songs